This is a list of female artistic gymnasts who have been on the Russian national team.

Current roster (2023)

Senior

2021

Senior

Senior Reserve

2020

Senior

Senior Reserve

Junior

2019 senior roster

2018 senior roster

2017 senior roster

2015 senior roster

References

Lists of female gymnasts
Gymnastics in Russia